Malba Tahan, full name Ali Yezzid Izz-Edin ibn-Salim Hanak Malba Tahan,  was a fictitious Persian scholar. He was the creation and frequent pen name of Brazilian author Júlio César de Mello e Souza.

Biography
According to the dedication and introductory chapters of The Man Who Counted (ostensibly written in the month of Ramadan in the year of the Hijra 1321, corresponding to November 1943 AD), Malba Tahan was a native and well-connected resident of Baghdad, a sharif (a descendant of Caliph Ali Ibn Abi Talib), and a hajj (a Muslim who made the pilgrimage to Mecca).

In the year of the Hijrah 1255 (1877 AD), Malba Tahan moved to Constantinople with his lifelong friend Beremiz Samir, the namesake of Malba's book The Man Who Counted.

Alternate biography
In other works by Julio César, however, Malba Tahan was born on May 6, 1885 in the apparently fictitious village of “Muzalit”, near Mecca (possibly modern Al-Muzahmiyya). He lived for 12 years in Manchester, England, where his father was a prosperous merchant.  After his father retired, the family moved to Cairo where they remained prosperous. Malba Tahan studied first in Cairo and afterwards went to Constantinople where he concluded his studies of social science.  His first literary works date from this period and were published in Turkish in several newspapers and magazines.  He was still a young man when his friend emir Abd el-Azziz ben Ibrahim appointed him mayor of Medina, a post which he filled with distinction for several years.  In 1912, at the age of 27, he received a large inheritance from his father, which allowed him to travel widely around the world, including China, Japan, Russia, India, and Europe.  He died in July 1931 near Riyadh, Arabia, fighting for the freedom of a local tribe.

Origin of the name
Malba Tahan is said to mean “the miller from the oasis” in Arabic. But Tahan was in fact the surname of one of Julio Souza's students, Maria Zechsuk Tahan.

References

External links
"Brazil's other passion: Malba Tahan and The man who counted" by Alex Bellos, BBC News, 6 May 2014

Fictional Iranian people
Fictional Muslims
Fictional scholars
Fictional social scientists